Pamplona station is a railway station located on the South Main Line in Camarines Sur, Philippines. It is still use for the Bicol Express and Isarog Limited.

History
The section of the Legazpi Division Line from Naga to Pamplona was opened on October 18, 1921. The rubble stone station building which was originally a wooden structure was rebuilt around 1939.

Philippine National Railways stations
Railway stations in Camarines Sur